Graffiti the World is the fourth studio album by American band Rehab. It was originally released on July 15, 2005, for Attica Sound with distribution via Redeye Distribution, and re-released on the same day in 2008 through Universal Republic Records. It is the group's first album with a new sound and line-up after the departure of Jason Brooks 'Buford'.

Track listings

Personnel
Danny "Boone" Alexander – vocals, producer
David "Demun" Jones – vocals on "This I Know"
Denny "Steaknife" Campbell – vocals on "Let' Em Know" & "Lawn Chair High"
William L. Whedbee – background vocals, guitar, producer, mixing
Michael D. Hartnett – guitar, producer
Fazal "Foz" Syed – guitar
Hano Leathers – bass guitar
Chris Hood – drums
Tom Knight – drums
Julius Speed – keyboards
Josh Butler – mixing
Kenneth Mount – mixing
Mark Eckard – engineering
Joel Mullis – engineering
Larry "Jazz" Anthony – mastering
Wayne Scheiner – producer
Farshid Arshid – executive producer
Ronnie Lewis – layout design

Charts

References

External links

2005 albums
Rehab (band) albums
Universal Records albums
Alternative rock albums by American artists
Southern hip hop albums